Macrurocampa dorothea is a species of moth in the family Notodontidae (the prominents). It was first described by Harrison Gray Dyar Jr. in 1896 and it is found in North America.

The MONA or Hodges number for Macrurocampa dorothea is 7976.

References

Further reading

 
 
 

Notodontidae
Articles created by Qbugbot
Moths described in 1896